

Events and publications

Year Overall 

Tony Falco by Andrea Lavezzolo

January
 January 5: Stanley Link's newspaper comic The Dailys is first published. It will run until 14 September 1957.
 January 24: Debut of Dudley D. Watkins' Biffo the Bear in The Beano. 
 January 26: Frank Godwin's Rusty Riley makes its debut. 
 January: In the Donald Duck story Wintertime Wager Donald's cousin Gladstone Gander makes his debut.
 Captain America Comics (1941 series) #65 - Timely Comics
Frankie and Lana (previously Frankie Comics) issue #13 - Timely Comics
 Sub-Mariner Comics (1941 series) #24 - Timely Comics
 The first issue of the Dutch comics magazine Ketelbinkie Krant is published, which is named Kapitein Rob's Vrienden outside Rotterdam. It will run until February 1957.

February
All-True Crime Cases (previously Official True Crime Cases) issue #26 (Timely Comics)
 Marvel Mystery Comics (1939 series) #85 - Timely Comics

March

 Collier's Weekly publishes Fredric Wertham's "Horror in the Nursery"
 Two-Gun Kid (1948 series) #1 - Timely Comics

April

April 30: The first episode the Mickey Mouse story The Atombrella and the Rhyming Man, by Bill Walsh and Floyd Gottfredson is published, which marks the debut of the Rhyming Man.
 Captain America Comics (1941 series) #66 - Timely Comics
Crime Fighters (1948 series) #1 - Timely Comics
 Sub-Mariner Comics (1941 series) #25 - Timely Comics

May
Blackstone the Magician issue 2 - Timely Comics
Comedy Comics vol. 2, issue 1 - Timely Comics
 Human Torch Comics (1940 series) #30 - Timely Comics

June
 June 9: U.S. bandleader Fred Waring starts an annual event where professional cartoonists are invited to come to his golf resort in Shwanee Inn. This will result in a huge collection of cartoons and comics: the Fred Waring collection.
Crime Exposed (1948 series) #1 - Timely Comics
Crime Fighters (1948 series) #2 - Timely Comics
 Marvel Mystery Comics (1939 series) #86 - Timely Comics
 Sub-Mariner Comics (1941 series) #26 - Timely Comics
 Two-Gun Kid (1948 series) #2 - Timely Comics

July
 July 1: Lev Gleason Publications, EC Comics, Famous Funnies, and Orbit Publications found the Association of Comics Magazine Publishers, to regulate the content of comic books in the face of the publication of Fredric Wertham's "Horror in the Nursery" and "The Psychopathology of Comic Books", and increasing public criticism of the comic book industry.
 July 18: The final episode of Bunky is published.
Blackstone the Magician #3 - Timely Comics
 Captain America Comics (1941 series) #67 - Timely Comics
Human Torch Comics (1940 series) #31 - Timely Comics
 The American Journal of Psychotherapy publishes Fredric Wertham's "The Psychopathology of Comic Books", which will lead to a witch hunt against comics.

August
 August 16: The first episode of André LeBlanc's Morena Flor is published. The series will run until 1951.
 August 20: In Al Capp's Li'l Abner the Shmoo makes its debut, which will become an unexpected merchandising phenomenon within a few months.
All-Winners Comics vol. 2, issue 1 - Timely Comics
Complete Mystery issue 1 - Timely Comics
Crime Fighters (1948 series) #3 - Timely Comics
Kid Colt, Hero Of The West issue 1 - Timely Comics
Krazy Komics vol. 2, issue 1 - Timely Comics
Lana (1948 series) #1 - Timely Comics
 Marvel Mystery Comics (1939 series) #87 - Timely Comics
 Sub-Mariner Comics (1941 series) #27 - Timely Comics
 Two-Gun Kid (1948 series) #3 - Timely Comics
 Venus (1948 series) #1 - Timely Comics
 Wow Comics, with issue #69, publishes its final issue, changing format and title to Real Western Hero, and continuing the numbering — Fawcett Comics

September
 September: First publication of the Swedish Disney comics magazine Kalle Anka & C:o.
 September 16: Willy Vandersteen's Suske en Wiske makes its debut in Tintin , but in a graphic style which is more advanced than the version which runs in Flemish newspapers. 
 September 16: Jacques Martin's The Adventures of Alix makes its debut in Tintin 
Blaze Carson issue 1 - Timely Comics
 Captain America Comics (1941 series) #68 - Timely Comics
 Human Torch Comics (1940 series) #32 - Timely Comics

October
 October 4: Walt Kelly's Pogo, a comic book feature since 1942, makes its debut as a newspaper strip.
 October 25: The Dutch Ministry of Culture puts an official government declaration in the newspapers to ask teachers to stop distributing dangerous and mind-corrupting comics.
Crime Fighters (1948 series) #4 - Timely Comics
Lana (1948 series) #2 - Timely Comics
 Marvel Mystery Comics (1939 series) #88 - Timely Comics
 Sub-Mariner Comics (1941 series) #28 - Timely Comics
 Two-Gun Kid (1948 series) #4 - Timely Comics
Venus (1948 series) #2 - Timely Comics

November
 November 7: The first episode of Kreigh Collins' Mitzi McCoy appears in print. The series will run for two years, whereupon it changes title to Kevin the Bold. 
 November 15: James Simpkins' Jasper the Bear makes its debut and will run until 1972.
 November 18: El diablo, by Gian Luigi Bonelli and Galep; Tex Willer, in his debut stories described as an outlaw, enters in the Texax Rangers and meets for the first time his partner Kit Carson.
 Captain America Comics (1941 series) #69 - Timely Comics
Crime Fighters (1948 series) #5 - Timely Comics
Human Torch Comics (1940 series) #33 - Timely Comics

December
Lana (1948 series) #3 - Timely Comics
Marvel Mystery Comics (1939 series) #89 - Timely Comics
 Sub-Mariner Comics (1941 series) #29 - Timely Comics
 Two-Gun Kid (1948 series) #5 - Timely Comics
Venus (1948 series) #3 - Timely Comics

Births

March
 March 16: Picanyol, Spanish comics artist (Ot el bruixot, L'Illa Perduda), (d. 2021).

May
 May 17: Carlos Romeu Müller, Spanish comics artist (Miguelito), (d. 2021).

Deaths

January
 January 26: Thomas Theodor Heine, German painter, cartoonist, comics artist and illustrator (worked for the magazine Simplicissimus), dies at age 90.

March
 March 15: Mary Tourtel, British illustrator and comics artist (Rupert Bear), passes away at age 74.
 March 18: Freddie Langeler, Dutch comics artist (Pietje Pluk en Kootje Kwak, Bobby den Speurder, Barendje Kwik, Bello Blafmeier), dies at age 49.
 March 24: Wally Wallgren, American comics artist (Inbad the Sailor, Tired Timothy, Helpful Hints, Hoosegow Herman), dies at age 65.

April
 April 24: Wallace Morgan, American illustrator and comics artist (a comic strip adaptation of the novel Cluny Brown), passes away at age 72 or 73.

May
 May 19: Herbert Morton Stoops, American illustrator and comics artist (continued Have You Seen Alonso?), passes away at age 60.

June
 June 13: Jimmy Frise, Canadian comics artist (Life's Little Comedies, later Birdseye Centre), dies at age 57.

July
 July 25: George Ernest Studdy, British comics artist (Bonzo the dog), dies at age 70.

August
 Specific date unknown: Feliu Elias, aka Apa, Spanish caricaturist, painter, art critic and comics artist (Las Hazañas del Pitafras), dies at age 59.

October
 October 5: Bert Green, British animator and comics artist (Stella and Gertie, Kids), dies at age 63.
 October 11: Ippei Okamoto, Japanese manga artist (Kuma o Tazumete, Tanpô Gashu, Kanraku, Match no Bou, Monomiyusan), passes away at age 62.

November
 November 4: Carl Thomas Anderson, American comics artist (Henry),  passes away at age 83.

December
 December 5: Fukujiro Yokoi, Japanese comics artist (Putchar in Wonderland), dies at age 36 from TBC.

Specific date unknown
 Jack Farr, American comics artist (Little Willie, Mr. Jolt, Chubby, If They Came Back And Did It Over Again Today, Bringing Up Bill, Bradley, Vitamin Vic, Donny the Dreamer, Gadget Man, Iron Munro, Romeo the Robot, Three-Ring Binks), dies at age 48 or 49.
 Christian Haugen, Norwegian novelist and comics writer, whose stories were adapted into comics by Arent Christensen, dies at age 53 or 54. 
 Joan García Junceda, Spanish illustrator and comics artist (Les Extraordinàries Aventures d'en Massagran), dies at age 66 or 67.

First issues by title

DC Comics 
 Leave It to Binky (February/March)
 Mr. District Attorney (January/February)
 Western Comics (January/February)

Dell Comics 
 The Lone Ranger (January/February)
 Tarzan (January/February)

Marvel Comics (Timely, Atlas) 
All-Winners Comics (vol. 2) cover-dated August (Timely)
Annie Oakley cover-dated Spring
Blaze Carson cover-dated September
Comedy Comics cover-dated May
Complete Mystery cover-dated August
Crime Exposed cover-dated June
Crimefighters cover-dated April
Kid Colt, Hero Of The West cover-dated August
Krazy Komics cover-dated August
Lana
Lawbreakers Always Lose!
Mitzi Comics
My Romance
Namora cover-dated August
Sun Girl cover-dated August (Timely)
Tex Morgan
Tex Taylor cover-dated September (Atlas)
Two-Gun Kid March (Atlas)
Venus cover-dated  August
Wacky Duck
Wild West cover-dated Spring (Atlas)
Witness

Other publishers 
 Adventures into the Unknown (B&I Publishing, Fall)
 The Adventures of Alix
 The Adventures of Dick Cole (Novelty Press)
 Funnyman (Magazine Enterprise)
 Kalle Anka & C:o (Egmont)
 Pantera Bionda (Giurma, April 24)
 Spirou et Fantasio (Dupuis)
 Spirou et l'aventure (Dupuis)
 Sweethearts (Fawcett, October)
 Tex Willer (Sergio Bonelli Editore, 30 September)
 Zago, Jungle Prince (Fox Feature Syndicate, September)

Comic strips 
 Pogo (Post-Hall Syndicate, October 4)
 Rusty Riley (King Features, January 26)
 Spiff and Hercules (L'Humanité on March 28, 1948)

Renamed titles 
All True Crime Cases issue #26 renamed from Official True Crime Cases as of the February cover date. (Marvel Comics)
All-Western Winners issue #2 renamed from All Winners Comics (vol. 2) as of the Winter cover date. (Timely Comics)
Blackstone the Magician #2 (cover-dated May) renamed from Blackstone the Magician Detective Fights Crime (EC Comics)
Frankie and Lana issue #13 renamed from Frankie Comics as of the January cover date. (Marvel Comics)
Mitzi's Boyfriend issue #2 renamed from Mitzi Comics (Marvel Comics)
Wild Western issue #3 renamed from Wild West as of the September cover date (Atlas Comics)

Initial appearances by character name
Cowboy Marshall in Western Comics #1 (January), created by Don Cameron - DC Comics
Evil Star in All Star Comics #44 (December), created by John Broome and Irwin Hasen - DC Comics
Fiddler (comics) in All-Flash #32 (January), created by Robert Kanigher and Lee Elias - DC Comics
Johnny Thunder in Flash Comics #01 (January), created by John Wentworth and Stan Aschmeier - DC Comics
Jor-El in Superman #53 (August), created by Jerry Siegel and Joe Shuster - DC Comics
Larry Lance in Flash Comics #92 (February), created by Robert Kanigher and Carmine Infantino - DC Comics
Mad Hatter, in Batman #49 (October), created by Bill Finger and Lew Sayre Schwartz - DC Comics
Merry Pemberton in Star-Spangled Comics #81 (June), created by Otto Binder and Win Mortimer - DC Comics
Nighthawk (DC Comics) in Western Comics #5 (September), created by Robert Kanigher and Charles Paris - DC Comics
Riddler in Detective Comics #140 (October), created by Bill Finger and Dick Sprang - DC Comics
Rodeo Rick in Western Comics #5 (September), created by Robert Kanigher and Charles Paris - DC Comics
Serafino by Egidio Gherlizza in Gaie Fantasie (Edizioni Alpe)
Star Sapphire (comics) in All-Flash Comics #32(December), created by Robert Kanigher and Lee Elias - DC Comics
Vicki Vale in Batman #49 (October), created by Bob Kane and Bill Finger - DC Comics
Wyoming Kid in Western Comics #1 (January), created by Don Cameron - DC Comics

References

 
Comics